Garrison Independent School District is a public school district based in Garrison, Texas (USA).  The district is located in northeastern Nacogdoches County and extends into a southeastern Rusk County.

Garrison ISD has three campuses -
 
Garrison High School (Grades 9-12)  
Garrison Middle (Grades 6-8)  
Garrison Elementary (Grades PK-5)

In 2009, the school district was rated "academically acceptable" by the Texas Education Agency.

References

External links
Garrison ISD

School districts in Nacogdoches County, Texas
School districts in Rusk County, Texas